Babin Potok may refer to:

Bosnia and Herzegovina
 Babin Potok, Donji Vakuf
 Babin Potok, Višegrad

Serbia
 Babin Potok, Prokuplje